José María Algué, SJ (29 December 1856 – 27 May 1930), was a Spanish Roman Catholic priest and meteorologist in the observatory of Manila. He invented the barocyclonometer, the nephoscope and a kind of microseismograph. The barocyclonometer was officially adopted by the US Navy and warships of the North Atlantic Squadron were equipped with them around 1914. Father Algué was an honorary member of the Royal Society of London and the Pontificia Accademia Romana.

Works
 (1897). Baguíos y Ciclones Filipinos
 (1897). El Barociclonómetro
 (1898). Las Nubes en el Archipiélago Filipino
 (1898). El Baguio de Samar y Leyte, Octubre 12-13, 1897
 (1900). El Archipiélago Filipino
 (1904). Atlas de Filipinas

Works in English translation
 (1900). Atlas of the Philippine Islands, Government Printing Office.
 (1902). Ground Temperature Observations at Manila, 1896–1902, Bureau of Public Printing.
 (1904). The Climate of the Philippines, Department of Commerce and Labor, Bureau of the Census.
 (1904). The Cyclones of the Far East, Bureau of Public Printing.
 (1908). "The Meteorological Conditions in the Philippine Islands, 1908," Quarterly Journal of the Royal Meteorological Society, Vol. XXXV, No. 151.
 (1909). Mirador Observatory, Baguio, Benguet, Bureau of Printing.

Notes

References
 Udías Vallina, Agustín (2003). Searching the Heavens and the Earth. The History of the Jesuit Observatories, Dordrecht: Kluwer Academic Publishers, p. 293.
 Walsh, James J. Science in the Philippines, New York.
 Warren, James Francis (2009). "Scientific Superman: Father José Algué, Jesuit Meteorology, and the Philippines under American Rule, 1897-1924." In Colonial Crucible: Empire in the Making of the Modern American State, Part VIII, University of Wisconsin Press.

See also
List of Roman Catholic scientist-clerics

1856 births
1930 deaths
Inventors from Catalonia
People from Manresa
Spanish meteorologists
Catholic clergy scientists
Jesuit scientists
Spanish people of the colonial Philippines